Conus atimovatae is a species of sea snail, a marine gastropod mollusc in the family Conidae, the cone snails, cone shells or cones.

These snails are predatory and venomous. They are capable of "stinging" humans.

Description
The size of the shell attains 21 mm.

Distribution
This marine species  occurs off Southern Madagascar.

References

 Monnier E., Limpalaër L. & Robin A. (2013) Revision of the Pionoconus achatinus complex. Description of three new species: P. koukae n. sp. from Oman, P. arafurensis n. sp. from northern Australia and P. rouxi n. sp. from Western Australia. Xenophora Taxonomy 1: 3-39.
 Puillandre N., Duda T.F., Meyer C., Olivera B.M. & Bouchet P. (2015). One, four or 100 genera? A new classification of the cone snails. Journal of Molluscan Studies. 81: 1-23

External links
 To World Register of Marine Species
 Gastropods.com: Pionoconus achatinus atimovatae (f)

atimovatae
Gastropods described in 2012